Mario Murillo Chaverri (24 January 1927 – 22 November 2012) was a Costa Rican  footballer who played professionally in the Colombian Professional Football League and Mexican Primera División. He also represented Costa Rica at international level.

Club career
Born in Santa Bárbara, Heredia, Murillo played as a defender, midfielder and goalkeeper. He began his career with local Costa Rican Primera División side C.S. Herediano in 1943. He helped the club to a runner-up finish in the 1943 Costa Rican Primera División season.

Murillo began playing professional football with Mexican Primera División side Moctezuma de Orizaba in 1945. Three seasons later, he joined Tiburones Rojos de Veracruz for one season. Nicknamed El cañonero, Murillo returned to Herediano briefly before playing professionally in Colombia with Universidad de Bogotá from 1950 to 1952. He also played in Venezuela for Litoral Sport Club.

He finished his playing career in Costa Rica, winning two of his four Primera titles with Herediano in 1956 and 1961. A serious foot injury ended his career in 1961.

International career
Murillo made 12 appearances for the Costa Rica national football team, making his debut in 1950.

Personal life
Murillo's brother, Evaristo, was also a professional footballer.

After retiring as a player, Murillo worked 30 years for the Instituto Costarricense de Electricidad.
Murillo died in November 2012.

References

External links

1927 births
2012 deaths
People from Heredia Province
Association football defenders
Costa Rican footballers
Costa Rica international footballers
C.S. Herediano footballers
C.D. Veracruz footballers
Liga FPD players
Liga MX players
Categoría Primera A players
Costa Rican expatriate footballers
Expatriate footballers in Mexico
Expatriate footballers in Colombia
Expatriate footballers in Venezuela